Vukašin Bogdanović (born 4 October 2002) is a Serbian professional footballer who plays as a centre-forward for Radnik Surdulica.

Honours
Vojvodina
Serbian Cup: 2019–20

References

External links
 
 
 

2002 births
People from Prokuplje
Living people
Serbian footballers
Serbia youth international footballers
Association football forwards
FK Vojvodina players
FK Kabel players
OFK Bačka players
FK Radnik Surdulica players
Serbian SuperLiga players
Serbian First League players